M. J. Library or Sheth Maneklal Jethabhai Pustakalaya is a public library in Ellisbridge, Ahmedabad, India.

History 
Mahatma Gandhi proposed to construct a public library by the collection of books he had at Sabarmati Ashram. Gandhi donated approx 7,000-15,000 books to start this library.

It was named after Maneklal Jethabhai; father of Rasiklal Maneklal, who donated to construct this library. It was inaugurated by Vallabhbhai Patel on 15 April 1938.

Architecture 
The architectural design of library was done by Claude Batley. It is built in Rajputana Colonial architecture style.

The entrance area is octagonal space with a dome on top of it. The building is ornamented with chhajjas, brackets and jalis which Batley considered "practical climatic essentials" and rooted in the traditional Indian architecture.

See also
 Ahmedabad Town Hall
 Vijali Ghar

References

External links
 Digital Collection of M. J. Library at Gandhi Heritage Portal

Library buildings completed in 1938
1938 establishments in India
Buildings and structures in Ahmedabad
British colonial architecture in India
Libraries in Gujarat
20th-century architecture in India
Libraries established in 1938